Alfred William Lutter III (born March 21, 1962) is an American entrepreneur, engineer, consultant, and former child actor.

Life and career
Lutter was born on March 21, 1962, in Ridgewood, New Jersey, where he also grew up. He graduated from Ridgewood High School in 1980. Lutter starred along with Ellen Burstyn and Jodie Foster in the 1974 Martin Scorsese film Alice Doesn't Live Here Anymore. The TV series Alice was a spin-off of this movie, in which he reprised his role as Alice's son Tommy in the pilot episode but was replaced by Philip McKeon when the series began.

Lutter also appeared as the young version of Woody Allen's character, Boris, in Love and Death; and played the brainy Alfred Ogilvie in the original The Bad News Bears, and its first sequel, The Bad News Bears in Breaking Training. He also starred as Phillip in The Cay, a TV movie about a black Caribbean Islander and a white American boy lost on an island.

Lutter earned a Bachelor of Science in civil engineering from Stanford University in 1984 and a Master of Science in management and engineering from Stanford in 1988. In June 1986, he founded Lutter Consulting, a company providing technology strategy, organizational management, and outsourced software development services. He was also the CTO of Cumulus Media, E*Offering, and Lynda.com.

Filmography

References

Bibliography
 .
 .

External links
 
 
 

1962 births
20th-century American businesspeople
20th-century American engineers
20th-century American male actors
21st-century American businesspeople
21st-century American engineers
American chief executives in the media industry
American chief technology officers
American consulting businesspeople
American male child actors
American male film actors
American male television actors
American management consultants
American radio executives
American software engineers
American technology chief executives
Businesspeople from California
Businesspeople from New Jersey
Engineers from California
Engineers from New Jersey
Living people
Male actors from New Jersey
People from Ridgewood, New Jersey
People in educational technology
Ridgewood High School (New Jersey) alumni
Stanford University alumni